Olivier Vannucci (born 24 May 1991) is a French former professional footballer who played as a centre-back.

Career statistics

Club

References

External links
 

1991 births
Living people
French footballers
Footballers from Corsica
Association football central defenders
Corsica international footballers
Ligue 2 players
SC Bastia players
Gazélec Ajaccio players